Michael John Boyle (11 October 1908 – after 1938) was an English footballer who made 126 appearances in the Football League playing as a full back for Bolton Wanderers, Reading, Exeter City and Darlington in the 1930s. He played three times for York City in the 1939–40 Football League season abandoned because of the Second World War.

References

1908 births
Year of death missing
People from Bearpark
Footballers from County Durham
English footballers
Association football fullbacks
Bolton Wanderers F.C. players
Reading F.C. players
Exeter City F.C. players
Darlington F.C. players
York City F.C. players
English Football League players
Place of death missing